Coquimbo Formation is a Miocene to Middle Pleistocene sedimentary formation located in Coquimbo Region in Norte Chico, Chile. The lowermost unit belongs to the lower Miocene, with the third-deepest unit dated at 11.9 ± 1.0 Ma. The uppermost unit of the formation is estimated at 1.2 Ma. In the area of Tongoy, the Coquimbo Formation was deposited in an ancient bay that was formed in a graben or half-graben, with a normal fault dipping east. Sea level changes during the Holocene have caused erosion to cut several marine terraces into the formation.

Fossil content 
The following fossils have been found in the formation:

See also 

 Cerro Ballena
 Elqui-Limarí Batholith
 Caleta Herradura Formation
 Navidad Formation
 Pisco Formation

References

Further reading 
 C. Acosta Hospitaleche, J. Canto, and C. P. Tambussi. 2006. Pingüinos (Aves, Spheniscidae) en Coquimbo (Mioceno Medio-Plioceno Tardio), Chile y su vinculación con las corrientes oceánicas. Revista Española de Paleontología 21(1):115-122
 

Geologic formations of Chile
Miocene Series of South America
Pliocene Series of South America
Neogene Chile
Pleistocene Chile
Mayoan
Montehermosan
Conglomerate formations
Sandstone formations
Siltstone formations
Tidal deposits
Paleontology in Chile
Geology of Coquimbo Region